The Men's 470 is a sailing event on the Sailing at the 2020 Summer Olympics program in Tokyo, in the 470 dinghy that takes place between 28 July - 4 August 2021 at Enoshima Yacht Harbor. 11 races (the last one a medal race) will be held. 19 teams have qualified for the event.

Medals were presented by IOC Member for Paraguy Camilo Pérez López Moreira and World Sailing Athlete Commission Chair Mrs Duriye Ozlem Akdurak.

Schedule

Results

Notes

References 

Men's 470
470 competitions
Men's events at the 2020 Summer Olympics